Until January 1, 2007 Thyholm was a municipality (Danish, kommune) in the former Ringkjøbing County on the island of Vendsyssel-Thy, a part of the Jutland peninsula in northwest Denmark.  The municipality included the island of Jegindø, and it covered an area of 76 km2.  It had a total population of 3,577 (2005).  Its last mayor was Peter Gade, a member of the Conservative People's Party (Det Konservative Folkeparti) political party. The main town and the site of its municipal council was the town of Hvidbjerg.

The municipality was located on Thyholm, a peninsula connected to Sydthy by a very narrow stretch of land and road, ca. 1.5 km long and .5 km wide.  Except for this narrow land connection Thyholm was surrounded by the waters of the Limfjord, which separates the island of Vendsyssel-Thy on which Thyholm is located from the Jutland peninsula to the south.  These waters defined most of the municipality's borders:

The 472 meter long Oddesund Bridge connects the former municipality at the town of Oddesund Nord to the town of Oddesund Syd.

 Hvidbjerg Parish
 Jegindø Parish
 Lyngs Parish
 Odby Parish
 Søndbjerg Parish

Thyholm municipality ceased to exist as the result of Kommunalreformen ("The Municipality Reform" of 2007).  It was merged into Struer Municipality. This created a municipality with an area of 248 km2 and a total population of 22,752 (2005). The new municipality belongs to Region Midtjylland ("Mid-Jutland Region").

External links 
 Struer municipality's official website (Danish only)
 Collection of links related to Thyholm (Danish only)

References  
 Municipal statistics: NetBorger Kommunefakta, delivered from KMD aka Kommunedata (Municipal Data)
 Municipal mergers and neighbors: Eniro new municipalities map

Former municipalities of Denmark